Stemphylium is a genus of fungal plant pathogen.

Selected species 
 Stemphylium alfalfae 
 Stemphylium bolickii 
 Stemphylium cannabinum 
 Stemphylium globuliferum 
 Stemphylium lycopersici 
 Stemphylium sarciniforme 
 Stemphylium solani 
 Stemphylium vesicarium

References

External links 
 USDA ARS Fungal Database

Fungal plant pathogens and diseases
Pleosporaceae
Dothideomycetes genera